Taunayia bifasciata is a species of three-barbeled catfish endemic to Brazil where it is found in the Upper Paraíba do Sul and Tietê River basins.  This species grows to a length of  SL.

Although presently the only member of the genus Taunayia, an apparently undescribed, cave-adapted species is known from Campo Formoso, Bahia.

References

Heptapteridae
Fish of South America
Fish of Brazil
Endemic fauna of Brazil
Taxa named by Carl H. Eigenmann
Fish described in 1900